"All Over Your Face" is a song recorded by American singer Ronnie Dyson. The song, written and produced by Butch Ingram, was released in 1983 by Cotillion Records. The song was mixed by the Morales and Munzibai duo.

Track listing 
12" vinyl
 US: Cotillion / 7-99841

Personnel 
Songwriter: Norman Ingram
Mixing: John Morales and Sergio Munzibai
Engineer: Butch Jones

Chart performance 
"All Over Your Face" reached number 23 on the US R&B chart and number 16 on the US dance chart.

References 

1983 singles
Ronnie Dyson songs
1983 songs
Cotillion Records singles
Post-disco songs